Simtex was a video game developer established by Steve Barcia in 1988. It created a number of turn-based strategy games for the PC, most notably the first two Master of Orion games. The company closed in 1997.

Games
Master of Orion (1993)
Master of Magic (1994)
1830: Railroads & Robber Barons (1995)
Master of Orion II: Battle at Antares (1996)
Mech Lords (renamed Metal Lords during development following FASA dispute) (1995 — unreleased)
Guardians: Agents of Justice (in development at time of closure — never finished)

The rights to Simtex's games were held by Atari until sold to various parties in a 2013 auction. Wargaming now owns the rights to the Master of Orion series, while Slitherine  holds the publishing rights to Master of Magic; it is eXtremePro Group Inc, that owns the full IP, based on trademark records. A third Master of Orion game named Master of Orion III was published by Atari (a subsidiary company of Infogrames) in 2003, having been developed by Quicksilver Software.

References

Video game companies established in 1988
Video game companies disestablished in 1997
Defunct video game companies of the United States
Video game development companies